Naval Base Capt (N) P.N. Sacharia is the Namibian Navy's largest naval base, situated at Walvis Bay. The base provides Naval support functions to the Namibian Navy and hosts the Navy Command.

History
In 1998 following the first graduation of the Namibian Navy Pioneer officers in Brazil, the site, north of the port of Walvis Bay identified as a potential Naval Base. After the ministry of Defence bought the piece of land, construction then started of the facility in 2002. In 2011 the construction of the 200 meter long jetty commenced and was completed afterwards.

The Base was commissioned in 2012 by president Hifikepunye Pohamba. A bust of Capt (N) Sacharia stands and the gate of the Base and is dedicated to Sailors that have passed on in the line of duty. At this occasion the NS Elephant and jetty were commissioned as well. Dredging of the seabed was done to seven meters

Current Status
The base is the homeport of the Navy fleet. It also currently hosts the Navy Headquarters, the Navy Operations Headquarters and navy Support Headquarters and fleet headquarters. As headquarters of the Navy all change of Navy command parades are held here.

Namesake
The Base is named after Captain(N) Phestus Sacharia the first Maritime Wing Commander. Captain (N) Sacharia  was the commander of the first group of core officers that went for training to Brazil.

Commandants

References

Military of Namibia
2012 establishments in Namibia